NGC 1264 is a low-surface-brightness barred spiral galaxy located about 145 million light-years away in the constellation Perseus. The galaxy was discovered by astronomer Guillaume Bigourdan on October 19, 1884.  NGC 1264 is a member of the Perseus Cluster.

See also 
 List of NGC objects (1001–2000)
 Malin 1 - a giant low surface brightness spiral galaxy

References

External links
 

Perseus Cluster
Perseus (constellation)
Barred spiral galaxies
Low surface brightness galaxies
1264
12270 
2643
Astronomical objects discovered in 1884
Discoveries by Guillaume Bigourdan